Onhokolo is a settlement of about 1,000 inhabitants in the north of Namibia in Omusati Region. Onhokolo is not connected to the water grid; villagers dig wells to draw water from.

References

Populated places in the Omusati Region